Sopen B. Shah is an American lawyer who is a former nominee to serve as the United States attorney for the Western District of Wisconsin.

Education

Shah received a Bachelor of Arts, magna cum laude, from Harvard College in 2008 and a Juris Doctor from Yale Law School in 2015.

Career

Prior to law school, Sopen was a management consultant at McKinsey & Company and a financial analyst at Bloomberg. After graduating law school, Shah served as a law clerk to Judge Amul Thapar of the United States District Court for the Eastern District of Kentucky from 2015 to 2016 and for Judge Debra Ann Livingston of the United States Court of Appeals for the Second Circuit from 2016 to 2017. In 2013, she worked in the criminal division of the U.S. Attorney's office for the Eastern District of New York. In 2014, she was a summer associate at Wachtell, Lipton, Rosen & Katz in New York City. She was a deputy solicitor general of Wisconsin from 2017 to 2019. She is Counsel at Perkins Coie where she has practiced since 2019.

Nomination as U.S. attorney 
In May 2021, Shah along with Assistant U.S. Attorney Diane Schlipper were recommended to senators Tammy Baldwin and Ron Johnson. On June 6, 2022, President Joe Biden nominated Shah to be the United States Attorney for the Western District of Wisconsin. On July 20, 2022, it was reported that Johnson was opposed to Shah's nomination due to a deleted tweet concerning the 2021 United States Capitol attack. On January 3, 2023, her nomination was returned to the president under Rule XXXI, Paragraph 6 of the United States Senate.

References

Living people
Year of birth missing (living people)
Place of birth missing (living people)
21st-century American women lawyers
21st-century American lawyers
Harvard College alumni
People associated with Perkins Coie
Yale Law School alumni